The Friends EP is an EP by the American rock band Ween, released on June 19, 2007 and was set to be released on 12" in July 2007. Ween co-founder and lead guitarist Dean Ween described the EP as "The ultimate party record, filled with good beats and good times. Perfect for your barbecue or doing bong hits or whatever it is that you guys do." A substantially different arrangement of the song "Friends" also appears on La Cucaracha.

Track listing
All tracks written by Ween.

References

2007 EPs
B-side compilation albums
2007 compilation albums
Ween compilation albums
Ween EPs